Jan Gustaf Andersson (born December 6, 1974) is a Swedish former football striker, ending his career in 2007 after not getting a new contract with Allsvenskan side Helsingborgs IF. He signed for the club in 2002, leaving IFK Göteborg. He was known as a versatile player who runs a lot and whose headings are a fearful weapon for opponents. He has played for the Sweden national football team. In January 2008, it was officially announced that Andersson's contract with HIF would not be extended. Andersson decided to end his professional career and start a civilian one instead, working as a coordinator for the public high schools in Helsingborg.

External links

1974 births
Living people
Swedish footballers
Sweden international footballers
Allsvenskan players
Västra Frölunda IF players
IFK Göteborg players
Helsingborgs IF players
Association football forwards
People from Trollhättan
Sportspeople from Västra Götaland County